"Dick in a Box" is a song by the American comedy group The Lonely Island featuring American  singer Justin Timberlake. The artists wrote the song with Katreese Barnes and Asa Taccone, who both produced it with Jorma Taccone. Saturday Night Live (SNL) creator and producer Lorne Michaels asked Samberg to write a musical sketch for the 2006 Christmas episode with Timberlake, who was returning as both host and musical guest. Samberg developed the concept with other members of the group before working with Timberlake on December 14. They recorded the track around midnight and spent the next day and a half filming the corresponding music video.

The sketch depicts two early 1990s R&B singers, played by Samberg and Timberlake, singing a holiday song about making a Christmas gift for their girlfriends of their penises in boxes. The sketch premiered on SNL as a Digital Short on December 16, 2006. The word "dick" was bleeped 16 times following an agreement with the Federal Communications Commission. SNL producers published an uncensored version of the sketch online right after its broadcast debut, a decision criticized by the Parents Television Council. In 2009, the song was released digitally as a single and included on The Lonely Island's debut studio album, Incredibad.

"Dick in a Box" became a viral hit on the internet, and had generated more than 28 million views on YouTube by October 2007. The song received generally positive reviews from both television and music critics, who praised its raunchy humor and Timberlake's performance. "Dick in a Box" has been recognized retrospectively as The Lonely Island's signature song and one of the best Christmas-themed SNL sketches. The track won the Primetime Emmy Award for Outstanding Original Music and Lyrics in 2007, and appeared on the Australian and Canadian single charts in 2009. Samberg and Timberlake reprised their roles in two Digital Shorts sequels, "Motherlover" (2009) and "3-Way (The Golden Rule)" (2011).

Background
Akiva Schaffer, Andy Samberg, and Jorma Taccone met while attending junior high together in Berkeley, California. They decided to move to Los Angeles in September 2000 and formed the comedy trio The Lonely Island, named after the nickname they gave to the apartment they shared. They hosted several short films on their website before signing to the variety show Saturday Night Live (SNL) in late August 2005. Samberg was promoted as a performing member for the 32nd season, while Taccone and Schaffer joined the show as writers. In December, the trio wrote and recorded "Lazy Sunday" with fellow cast member Chris Parnell, which was broadcast as their second Digital Short. The gangsta rap song received over five million views on YouTube by February 2006, becoming the first television clip to go viral on the online video platform. The track's popularity contributed to the success of YouTube and reintroduced SNL to a younger audience.

Justin Timberlake first appeared on SNL as a musical guest in 2000, performing as a member of the American boy band NSYNC. He subsequently appeared as both host and musical guest in an episode in October 2003, in which he demonstrated his acting potential with an impression of Jessica Simpson and his work with Jimmy Fallon on The Barry Gibb Talk Show sketch. "Hosting SNL was something I'd always wanted to do. The show allowed me to play to my strengths—mixing music with comedy seemed like a way into that world", Timberlake recalled. After the show, he received several acting offers and spent the next two years launching his acting career. He shot four films, including Edison Force (2005) and Alpha Dog (2006), before working on his second studio album FutureSex/LoveSounds (2006). In late November 2006, Timberlake announced his return to SNL for the December 16 episode as host and musical guest.

Writing and recording

On December 12, 2006, when Timberlake was on track to host SNL for the second time, creator and executive producer Lorne Michaels asked Samberg to try writing a funny skit to showcase Timberlake's singing skills. Although the writing team originally came up with a different idea, Michaels insisted they exploit more of Timberlake's musical side. Inspired by the music they grew up listening to, members of The Lonely Island wanted to write an early 1990s R&B song that was similar to the work of Jodeci, R. Kelly, the Isley Brothers, LeVert, and H-Town. That night, they contacted associate music director Katreese Barnes to help them work on the song; she was later credited as a songwriter and producer. Samberg felt the concept of imitating a 1990s-style band was "a perfect fit" for Timberlake, who was a member of a boy band.

The concept of the track was not decided until December 14, when Jorma came up with the "dick in a box" premise. Once the trio agreed the concept was funny enough, they presented a rough draft of the song to Timberlake. A fan of 1990s-style music, Timberlake immediately accepted the song. He was the only one who was confident about the sketch. The trio was having doubts about the crass joke and the bygone musical concept. Timberlake felt it was important to make the song "really singable" and suggested several changes to "Dick in a Box". He came up with the hook and the line "Mid-day at the grocery store", while adding pauses to make the song more catchy. Schaffer suggested adding the three steps of making the box into the lyrics. Samberg, who was feeling nervous when working on the idea with Timberlake, said the singer "took the reigns [sic] and schooled us on how to record and make it sound fantastic". The writers finished writing the lyrics within two hours.

Like other SNL sketches, "Dick in a Box" was recorded and produced in a very short time. Samberg and Timberlake recorded their voice track for two hours around midnight on December 14-15, right after finishing the lyrics. They used special equipment, including a $500 microphone, in Samberg's office. Timberlake recalled the crew were laughing frantically during the production and that the "delirium of no sleep" contributed to the song's humor. Although Samberg's voice cracked a few times, Timberlake's easygoing attitude made him more relaxed throughout the recording session. Asa Taccone, Jorma's brother, worked on the track in Los Angeles while the other writers were in New York City. Initially, Jorma gave his brother the specific outline of the track for him to work with, which Asa described as a "cheesy, 90s, Color Me Badd type track". Asa then sent the writers several instrumental tracks and went through each beat with them during phone calls. He was nervous working with Timberlake and felt the process was chaotic because of the limited work time. "It was semi-terrifying having [Timberlake] listen to my stuff. I was a kid back then. I'm sure the stuff I was playing was mostly terrible," Asa said. NBC was not originally aware of his contribution to the track, so Jorma paid him $60 for it.

Music video

After listening to the finished audio track, Barnes felt it would "be a big hit" if they had an equally funny video for it.
The music video for "Dick in a Box" was filmed in New York City in a day and a half. The crew spent December 15 filming the video. Timberlake left occasionally to prepare for the show; they finished the session at 3:00 AM the following morning. Schaffer directed the video with Jorma's assistance. Indoor scenes were filmed in Studio 8H, SNLs permanent set. Timberlake and Samberg sported wigs and fake short beards for the video.

Schaffer felt the filming process was both frightening and funny, saying, "We knew it was a really dumb idea and we weren't sure if we were even gonna get away with it on the air, but once we were actually making it, it was just super fun!" Members of The Lonely Island wanted to do the filming as quickly as they could, since Timberlake was busy with other hosting gigs and sketches. Kristen Wiig and Maya Rudolph played the duo's lovers. Wiig felt the song would be a hit after hearing it and seeing the film set. It was not until 4:00 PM on December 16, less than eight hours before it was to go live, that the video was ready to be shown to NBC executive Rick Ludwin.

The video begins with Samberg and Rudolph sitting in front of a fireplace. Samberg says he has a Christmas gift for her and instructs her to "just sit down and listen". The balladeers are wearing silk suits, jewel-toned rayon shirts, herringbone chains, trimmed goatees, and sunglasses. The men each give their lovers a box with their penis inside as a present, and ask them to open it and look inside. The singers stroke their goatees and pose with each displaying a gift-wrapped box attached to his groin. Their girlfriends seem aroused and excited by their presents, while the men aggressively rub roses and feathers in the women's faces. Near the chorus, the men sing about how their presents are better than other gifts, such as diamond rings, fancy cars, or luxury houses. The duo suggest their present is suitable for all holidays, including Christmas, Hanukkah, and Kwanzaa. At one point, they give step-by-step instructions on how to create the gift.

The video cuts between scenes of Samberg and Timberlake dancing and singing in various urban landscapes—in a park, on a ferry in front of the East River, and on a basketball court, where Timberlake is seen hanging from a basketball hoop with a gift box on his crotch. At the end of the video, the men sing about giving the present on multiple occasions—at their parents' houses, the grocery store, and backstage at the Country Music Association Awards—while being arrested by the New York City Police Department (NYPD), presumably for indecent exposure.

Composition
"Dick in a Box" is an R&B song with a runtime of 2:41. According to Universal Music Publishing Group's digital sheet music for the song, "Dick in a Box" is composed in the key of C minor and set in common time signature, with a moderately slow groove of 80 beats per minute. The vocals span two octaves, from C4 up to C6. Music critics compared the track to the work of Color Me Badd, noting the song's spoken-word breakdown and the way the last syllables of the refrain go increasingly up. Idolators Noah wrote the track is a "slightly more up-front–and generously Yuletide-themed" version of Color Me Badd's "I Wanna Sex You Up" (1991). Critics also found the R&B track was influenced by American groups New Kids on the Block, Hall & Oates, and Backstreet Boys.

David Jeffries of AllMusic described "Dick in a Box" as an imitation of teen pop, while Stephen Saito of Premiere called the slow jam "an ode to the phallic present for all occasions". Chris Mincher of The A.V. Club and Stuart McGurk of GQ viewed it as a midtempo synth rock track that soundtracks a rapidly unfolding horror. "Dick in a Box" has been described as a Christmas song by critics, including Mincher who highlighted its release in the special Christmas episode of SNL. Ross Bonaime of Paste referred to it is a hybrid between "a Christmas song, a '90s R&B parody and a joke about bad gift giving". Believed the sketch qualified as a Christmas film, Matthew Dessem of Slate pointed out the Christmas setting and the theme surrounding Christmas presents, as well as the non-Christmas holidays mentioned in the song all take place around Christmas.

Premise and themes

The music the songwriters grew up listening to inspired "Dick in a Box". They wanted to make a parody of the members of a 1990s R&B group, who were still stuck in that era. It follows the tone of other songs by The Lonely Island, which focus on mundane characters who express themselves aggressively about their daily lives. The fictional duo was named 2:30 AM, which Timberlake explained is the time (until 5:00 AM) when "really strong lovemaking happens". Despite referring to 1990s R&B style music, Timberlake said the sketch was not "parodying anyone in particular".

Timberlake explained the premise, where the characters genuinely give their genitalia as Christmas presents to their lovers, aimed for comedic effect, while making the characters even more ridiculous. He thought initially the idea was creepy but still pursued it. The premise was based on dick jokes and some men's habit of putting their penises in unusual things. "It's nothing new. Guys have been putting their dicks in boxes since caveman days," Schaffer said. Despite not trying it himself, Samberg had heard stories from other people doing similar things with bad results. Jorma said a scene in the 1982 Barry Levinson film Diner, in which Mickey Rourke's character tricks his date into groping him by placing his penis inside a box of popcorn at a movie theater also inspired the premise. An identical act can be found in a scene of La Boum (1980), directed by Claude Pinoteau. Mincher felt the act was "so absurd (and unexpectedly raunchy) that few watching it live could see it coming".

Critics have offered various interpretations of "Dick in a Box". Penny Spirou in Music in Comedy Television: Notes on Laughs (2017) and Virginia Heffernan of The New York Times viewed the sketch as a satire of "the bad faith of the pandering R&B foreplay songs", which was made to trick a women's desire for comfort, until she "opens that nicely wrapped present". Heffernan also linked the content to Timberlake's public image in the 2000s, saying, "He's all sweet, but he gets what he wants. And no one, not even Janet Jackson, stands in his way... [The audiences] have decided, for now, that he's cooler than they thought." Terry Gross of Fresh Air opined the sketch is a parody of male narcissism, in which the characters suggest "the greatest gift [a man] could give to a lady is a very special lovemaking". She noted the singers emphasize "how great he is, not how much he loves his girlfriend, but really how much he loves himself". Mincher argued that besides the joke about men's obsession with their own genitalia, the sketch pokes fun at several men's gift-giving mistakes. A man believes he is the greatest present his girlfriend could receive, implying a woman should provide sexual favors for her man. He dismisses more expensive presents as superficial. Mincher suggests the sketch is a product of male fantasy detached from the reality of relationships.

Release
The video for "Dick in a Box" was sent to NBC executive Rick Ludwin after the raw editing had been finished at 4:00 PM on December 16. The Federal Communications Commission (FCC) took issue with the actors saying "dick" on-air and wanted to stop the sketch's screening. SNL producers came to an agreement with the FCC that the song could be aired with the word bleeped out. However, since the FCC has no jurisdiction over the content on the internet, the producers asked Ludwin to make the uncensored version available online. Ludwin, who was initially hesitant about the idea, watched the footage with a representative from the NBC legal department. He found the sketch funny and realized that those searching on the internet specifically for the video would not be upset by its content. He sought final approval for the uncensored sketch from Kevin Reilly, the president of NBC Entertainment, and Jeff Zucker, the chief executive of NBCUniversal Television Group—both of whom approved the idea. Editing continued on the video for the rest of the day, in time for its television debut.

"Dick in a Box" premiered as a Digital Short on the Christmas episode of the 32nd season of SNL, which aired on December 16, 2006. NBC bleeped the word "dick" 16 times as agreed with the FCC. After the broadcast concluded at 1:00 AM on December 17, both the censored and uncensored versions of the sketch were made available on NBC's website and YouTube channel, under the heading "Special Treat in a Box" or "Special Christmas Box". A cautionary warning was shown at the beginning of the unbleeped version, while viewers had to affirm they were over 18 to access the video. Besides the official video uploaded by NBC, bootleg copies of the clip were being removed from YouTube at the network's request.

The release made SNL the first scripted comedy show on a broadcast network to use the internet to avoid FCC control over its explicit content. On December 21, the Parents Television Council (PTC) called on NBC and asked the network to explain the decision to post both versions of the song online. L. Brent Bozell, the president of the PTC, said that the video is "a new low for NBC" and the online release "is blatantly irresponsible and unacceptable". In an interview published by The New York Times the same day, Michaels said that posting the equivalent of a "director's cut" of his late-night show on the internet "will be the exception" in the future. He believed other shows and networks would be likely to follow NBC's lead in making inappropriate-for-TV material available online, saying. "Now that the door has been opened, some things will go through it."

Days after "Dick in a Box" was released, Samberg expressed his interest in creating an album full of comedy hip hop and R&B songs. "It's something we've always wanted to do and we've been working on putting it together," Samberg said. Universal Republic released the album, titled Incredibad, on February 10, 2009. The album included 14 new tracks the trio recorded while living together in Encino, Los Angeles, during the summer of 2009. "Dick in a Box" was one of five SNL Digital Shorts on the album, with "Lazy Sunday", "Natalie's Rap", "Ras Trent", and "Space Olympics". This was made possible because of the partnership between NBC and Broadway Video that gave Universal Republic the rights to release these videos. It was the first time these sketches had been released without a laugh track. "We spend so much time getting stuff to sound good... but nobody has ever really heard a clean version of those songs," Jorma said. Before the album's release, the lead single "Jizz in My Pants" was broadcast and released digitally in December 2008, followed by the first-ever digital release of "Dick in a Box" on iTunes and Amazon on January 27, 2009. "Dick in a Box" later appeared on the Saturday Night Live – The Best of '06–'07 extra DVD, released in March 2008.

Public reaction
The SNL episode received a 5.3/13 Nielsen rating/share in the 18–49 demographic, and attracted seven million American viewers during its initial broadcast, one of the show's highest ratings for a Christmas episode. According to the New York Daily News, less than a week after its online release, the uncensored version of the sketch had been viewed over 320,000 times on NBC's website and 3.5 million times on YouTube. Thanks to a partnership between NBC and YouTube, the video quickly became one of the 20 most-viewed on the site and one of the quickest viral hits of 2006. It generated 7.5 million views in one week at the end of December. According to Bri Holt, founder of the online video analytics site Vidmeter, there were at least 18 identical copies of "Dick in a Box" posted to various YouTube and Google Video accounts, bringing the total views to over 20 million as of February 2007.

The official uncensored video garnered more than 15,000 comments and 28 million views (34.9 million views when combined with other versions) before NBC took down its YouTube channel in preparation for the launch of Hulu on October 21. On December 23, 2008, "Dick in a Box" appeared at number nine on the Guardian Viral Video Chart: Christmas Special showing the year's top viral videos, compiled by The Guardian and viralvideochart.com. An official video of the sketch was uploaded again on YouTube in December 2018, which had garnered 5.5 million views as of April 2020. Following its release as a digital single in January 2009, "Dick in a Box" debuted at number 82 on the Canadian Hot 100 and number 48 on the Billboard Canadian Digital Song Sales chart. Both were The Lonely Island's first entries on the charts. In late June, the single peaked at number 61 on the Australian Singles Chart, the third track from Incredibad to appear on the chart after the top 10 entries "Jizz in My Pants" and "I'm on a Boat". In January 2011, "Dick in a Box" peaked at number eight on the Billboard Comedy Digital Track Sales.

Following the rebroadcast of "Dick in a Box" on SNL, the FCC received several complaints from viewers about the sketch. A report in The Atlantic showed that "Dick in a Box" and "Djesus Uncrossed," a 2013 parody of Django Unchained starring Christoph Waltz, were the most frequent targets of complaint letters sent to the FCC about SNL by viewers from 2012 to 2015. Most of the letters were suspicious of Timberlake's appearance after his part in the Janet Jackson controversy at the Super Bowl XXXVIII halftime show.

Critical reception
"Dick in a Box" received generally positive reviews from television and music critics. Annie Wu of TV Squad was "laughing [her] head off" while watching the sketch and was impressed with Timberlake's performance. Palmer wrote that Timberlake and Samberg had "given new meaning to 'giving of yourself' and 'package' with the perfect gift for that special someone". Both Wu and Palmer were confused about the sketch's title and content during the broadcast. Palmer called the censored version pointless. Gilbert Cruz of Entertainment Weekly thought the sketch was a nice way "to cap off what has been a fantastic year for [Timberlake]" and suggested SNL should focus more on the Digital Shorts. Tom Hall of IndieWire praised the Digital Short as the highlight of the show, while Mark Lore of News & Review felt the track was Timberlake's best work since "Rock Your Body" (2003). Adam Sternbergh of New York magazine described it as "by far the most hilarious Timberlake–starring, Kwanzaa-referencing, Color Me Badd–parodying, 'put your junk in that box'–instructing short video you will ever see".

 
Larry Carroll of IGN called the song "the closest to 'Lazy Sunday' that we've seen yet". He praised the "dead-on spoof of that musical time period" and Wiig's brief cameo, and concluded, "Mr. Timberlake brought a very special package to us all this year, and he didn't even have it attached to his crotch." Heffernan said that Timberlake "[sealed] his triumph when he managed to score a cherished asset: a holiday classic". She commended the joke as both mindless fun and imaginative. Several critics chose the sketch as the funniest moment of the episode, including Larry Carroll, Matt Dentler of IndieWire, and a writer from Rap-Up. Joel Keller of TV Squad picked the sketch as one of the best television moments in 2006, while Brian Zoromski of IGN listed the sketch as his favorite Digital Short and the most memorable moment of the year on SNL.

Critics have recognized retrospectively that "Dick in a Box" is one of the best Christmas-themed SNL sketches. Bonaime wrote the sketch is cheerfully egotistical and "might be the pinnacle of the Digital Short's success". Tara Aquino of VH1 labeled the track as "The Christmas Song" for millennials that should "make its way to every station come December 1st". Eric Spitznagel of Vanity Fair wrote the track is as recognizable as Steve Martin's "King Tut" (1978). Jody Rosen of Vulture commended the track as a "sublime cultural artifact that deserves to be in the next time capsule that NASA shoots off toward Jupiter". Hillary Busis of Entertainment Weekly ranked the track as Timberlake's best moment on SNL, calling it hilarious and "largely responsible for Timberlake's stellar hosting reputation". Billboard hailed it as one of the show's best musical moments, along with "Lazy Sunday". Rolling Stone listed the skit at number three on their 50 Greatest Saturday Night Live Sketches of All Time list, calling it Timberlake's best song post-FutureSex/LoveSounds.

On July 19, 2007, it was announced that "Dick in a Box" had received a nomination for a Primetime Emmy Award for Outstanding Original Music and Lyrics. Other nominees in the category included "My Drunken Irish Dad" (from Family Guy), "Merry Ex-Mas" (from MADtv), "Everything Comes Down to Poo", and "Guy Love" (both from Scrubs). The songwriters won the award at the 59th Primetime Creative Arts ceremony on September 8. "Dick in a Box" was credited for setting a precedent for more explicit material to earn nominations and win in the Emmy music-related categories.

Live performances and usage in media
On February 7, 2007, Timberlake and Samberg gave a surprise performance of "Dick in a Box" for the first time at the Madison Square Garden during Timberlake's concert tour FutureSex/LoveShow. The duo sang in front of a sold-out stadium of 18,000 people, including rapper P. Diddy, Donald Trump and his wife Melania. They performed the track as an encore, beginning with an announcer introducing them as a new band that had "the most-watched video on YouTube". The singers wore the characters' costumes and facial hair from the sketch, with a gift box attached below the belt. Samberg changed the holiday lyrics to "Valentine's Day... Flag Day... Kwanzaa", while Timberlake was giggling as he delivered the deadpan lines. At one point, Timberlake fell on his knee and sang the line "All across America, a dick in a box." After the song, Timberlake came back onstage and apologized, "I'm sorry if I offended some of you, but I could not resist."

Billboard felt the surprise performance "was hilarious if wholly unnecessary". Caryn Ganz of MTV wrote that the singers struggled with the nasal vocal performance and the song "landed a bit awkwardly in context". Ganz, however, noted that the audience "went truly berserk" with the performance. Amelia McDonell-Parry of Rolling Stone wrote "Samberg hardly has the pipes to fill an arena, but no one seemed to mind." Timberlake, who was absent during the Primetime Creative Arts ceremony on September 8, celebrated after being notified of his Emmy win by performing a piano rendition of the song at the Tacoma Dome, Washington. Samberg was willing to perform "Dick in a Box" with Timberlake at the main 59th Primetime Emmy Awards ceremony, held in Los Angeles on September 16. The Emmy Awards producers were reportedly unsure about airing the explicit content and asked the duo to come up with a more family-friendly version of the track. The singers rejected the idea, and the performance was canceled.

The online release of "Dick in a Box" resulted in many users filming response videos on YouTube, in which they either present their own gift box or give instructions on how to do the box. Leah Kauffman, who was a Temple University student, wrote and recorded a parody from the female perspective of the sketch, titled "My Box in a Box". The track's music video showed a woman lip sync to Kauffman's vocals and dance around with a gift-wrapped box in front of her crotch. The video had attracted more than three million views by January 2007. American band Umphrey's McGee covered "Dick in a Box" as an encore on December 31, 2006, at the Aragon Ballroom in Chicago. In "Koi Pond", an episode of the sixth season of the American comedy television series The Office, Michael Scott (portrayed by Steve Carell) dresses in a suit similar to Samberg and Timberlake's characters, with a box wrapped as a present attached to his waist, while slipping a noose around his neck and faking a hanging to scare a group of young visitors. On an episode of The Ellen DeGeneres Show, aired in January 2007, Ellen DeGeneres performed a jingle for AQUA2GO water drink boxes to the tune of "Dick in a Box". The following month, Facebook created a virtual gift shop for Valentine's Day that included a box with a bow on top and a hole cut into one of its sides.

Impact

Like "Lazy Sunday", "Dick in a Box" has found a wider audience during its online release than the initial television broadcast. The sketch, which has been rebroadcast over the years, has become one of the most popular SNL sketches and widely recognized as one of The Lonely Island's signature songs. The viral video helped solidify The Lonely Island as a stand-alone comic act. In an interview with Esquire in 2013, Samberg said, "[Michaels] says the thing you're known for will be in quotes in the middle of your name. He's Lorne 'SNL' Michaels, and I'm Andy 'Dick in a Box' Samberg." Terri Schwartz of IFC opined "'Lazy Sunday' might have been the first Lonely Island Digital Short to be featured on SNL, but it was 'Dick in a Box' that made the Digital Short one of the most anticipated skits on the improv series." Many people have since chosen costumes similar to those of Timberlake and Samberg for Halloween. Samberg was flattered by the costume trend, while Wiig was astonished by it, saying, "It was crazy. So I did expect it because I knew it was funny, but you never expect the level to which it goes." Samberg and Timberlake's costumes are also displayed at Saturday Night Live: The Exhibition, an exhibition about a week in the show's life on New York's Fifth Avenue.

Jorma recalled the working experience with Timberlake has become their standard, saying, "Getting to work with someone as wildly talented as Justin Timberlake, getting to spend maybe four days with him... That was amazing." "Dick in a Box" has inspired many subsequent sketches by The Lonely Island, including the similar-themed "Jizz In My Pants" and "I Just Had Sex", and has spawned two sequels, where Timberlake and Samberg reprised their roles. In "Motherlover" (2009), broadcast during the 34th season, the duo sings about their desire to have sex with each other's mothers (played by Patricia Clarkson and Susan Sarandon) as a tribute to Mother's Day. They find themselves invited to a threesome with a girl they met at the Payless ShoeSource (played by Lady Gaga) in season 36's "3-Way (The Golden Rule)" (2011). "Motherlover" was released as a single in 2011 and appeared on The Lonely Island's second studio album, Turtleneck & Chain (2011); while "3-Way (The Golden Rule)" was digitally released after the broadcast and appeared on the third studio album, The Wack Album (2013). The duo also re-appeared on the special 100th Digital Short, which was broadcast in season 37 in May 2012.

Credits and personnel
Credits adapted from the liner notes of Incredibad.

Studio locations
 Mixed at Ansons Pocket Studio (Yorktown Heights, New York)
 Mastered at The Cutting Room (New York City, New York)

Personnel
 Andy Samberg lead vocals, songwriting
 Akiva Schaffer songwriting
 Jorma Taccone songwriting, producer
 Asa Taccone songwriting, producer
 Justin Timberlake lead vocals, songwriting
 Katreese Barnes songwriting, producer
 Brian Sperber mixing
 Tony Gillis mastering

Charts

Release history

Notes

References

Footnotes

Media notes

 
 
 
 
 
 
 
 
 
 
  Transcript archived on 16 July 2021.

Print sources

External links
 

2006 songs
2009 singles
American Christmas songs
Male vocal duets
Musical parodies
The Lonely Island songs
Saturday Night Live sketches
Saturday Night Live in the 2000s
Songs written by Justin Timberlake
Justin Timberlake songs
Universal Republic Records singles
Viral videos